Dialects are linguistic varieties that may differ in pronunciation, vocabulary, spelling and other aspects of grammar. For the classification of varieties of English only in terms of pronunciation, see regional accents of English.

Overview 
Dialects can be defined as "sub-forms of languages which are, in general, mutually comprehensible." English speakers from different countries and regions use a variety of different accents (systems of pronunciation) as well as various localized words and grammatical constructions; many different dialects can be identified based on these factors. Dialects can be classified at broader or narrower levels: within a broad national or regional dialect, various more localised sub-dialects can be identified, and so on. The combination of differences in pronunciation and use of local words may make some English dialects almost unintelligible to speakers from other regions without any prior exposure.

The major native dialects of English are often divided by linguists into three general categories: the British Isles dialects, those of North America, and those of Australasia. Dialects can be associated not only with place but also with particular social groups. Within a given English-speaking country, there is a form of the language considered to be Standard English: the Standard Englishes of different countries differ and can themselves be considered dialects. Standard English is often associated with the more educated layers of society as well as more formal registers.

British and American English are the reference norms for English as spoken, written, and taught in the rest of the world, excluding countries in which English is spoken natively such as Australia, Canada, Ireland, and New Zealand. In many former British Empire countries in which English is not spoken natively, British English forms are closely followed, alongside numerous American English usages that have become widespread throughout the English-speaking world. Conversely, in many countries historically influenced by the United States in which English is not spoken natively, American English forms are closely followed. Many of these countries, while retaining strong British English or American English influences, have developed their own unique dialects, which include Indian English and Philippine English.

Chief among other native English dialects are Canadian English and Australian English, which rank third and fourth in the number of native speakers. For the most part, Canadian English, while featuring numerous British forms, alongside indigenous Canadianisms, shares vocabulary, phonology and syntax with American English, which leads many to recognise North American English as an organic grouping of dialects. Australian English, likewise, shares many American and British English usages, alongside plentiful features unique to Australia and retains a significantly higher degree of distinctiveness from both larger varieties than does Canadian English. South African English, New Zealand English and Irish English are also distinctive and rank fifth, sixth, and seventh in the number of native speakers.

Europe 
English language in Europe

Great Britain 
 British English

England 
English language in England:
 Standard English (Not to be confused with the accent Received Pronunciation)
 Northern
 Lancastrian (Lancashire) and Cheshire
 Bolton
 Mancunian (Manchester)
 Scouse (Merseyside)
 Cumbrian (Cumbria) 
 Barrovian (Barrow-in-Furness)
 Northumbrian (Northumberland and County Durham)
 Geordie (Tyneside) 
 Mackem (Sunderland)
 Pitmatic (Great Northern Coalfield)
 Smoggie (Teesside)
 Yorkshire 
 East Midlands
 Lincolnshire
 West Midlands
 Black Country
 Brummie (Birmingham)
 Potteries (north Staffordshire)
 Coventry
 East Anglian
 Norfolk
 Suffolk
 Southern
 Cockney (working-class London and surrounding areas)
 Estuary (middle-class London, Home Counties and Hampshire)
 Multicultural London (London)
 Sussex
 West Country
 Cornwall
 Bristolian
 Dorset
 Janner (Plymouth)

Scotland 
 Scottish English comprising varieties based on the Standard English of England.
 Glasgow
 Highland English

Wales 
 Welsh English
 Abercraf
 Cardiff
 Gower
 Port Talbot

Non-geographic based English 
 Angloromani

British dependencies and territories 
 Channel Islands: Channel Island English
 Isle of Man: Manx English
 Gibraltar: Gibraltarian English

Ireland 
 Hiberno-English (Irish English)
 Ulster
 Ulster Scots dialects (contested)
 Leinster
 Dublin 
 Dublin 4 (D4)
 South-West Ireland
 Extinct
 Yola language (also known as Forth and Bargy dialect), thought to have been a descendant of Middle English, spoken in County Wexford
 Fingallian, another presumed descendant of Middle English, spoken in Fingal

Continental Europe 
 Euro English

Denmark 
 Danish English

Finland 
 Finnish English

Germany 
 German English

Malta 
 Maltese English

Netherlands 
 Dutch English

Norway 
 Norwegian English

Spain 
 Spanglish

Sweden 
 Swedish English

North America

United States 
Map of American English.
American English:
 Cultural and ethnic American English
 African American English 
 African-American Vernacular English ("Ebonics")
 Cajun Vernacular English
 General American: the "standard" or "mainstream" spectrum of American English
 Latino (Hispanic) Vernacular Englishes
 Chicano English (Mexican-American English)
 Miami English
 New York Latino English
 Pennsylvania Dutch English
 Yeshiva English
 Regional and local American English
 Northern American English
 Inland Northern English: Chicago, Cleveland, Detroit, Milwaukee, Western New York, the Lower Peninsula of Michigan, and most of the U.S. Great Lakes region
 New England English
 Eastern New England English (including Boston and Maine English)
 Rhode Island English
 Western New England English: Connecticut, Hudson Valley, western Massachusetts, and Vermont
 North-Central (Upper Midwestern) English: Brockway, Minot, Bismarck, Bemidji, Chisholm, Duluth, Marquette, etc. 
 Metropolitan New York English
 Southeast Super-Regional English
 Midland American English
 North Midland English: Iowa City, Omaha, Lincoln, Columbia, Springfield, Muncie, Columbus, etc.
 South Midland English: Oklahoma City, Tulsa, Topeka, Wichita, Kansas City, St. Louis (in transition), Decatur, Indianapolis, Cincinnati, Dayton, etc.
 "Hoi Toider" English: traditional dialect of the Chesapeake Bay, Tangier, Ocracoke, the Outer Banks, Virginia Barrier Islands, etc.
 New Orleans English
 Philadelphia English
 Baltimore English
 Southern American English
 Southern Appalachian English: Linden, Birmingham, Chattanooga, Knoxville, Asheville, and Greenville
 Texan English: Lubbock, Odessa, and Dallas 
 Tennesseean English: Nashville, Murfreesboro, Memphis
 Western American English
 California English
 Pacific Northwest English
 Western Pennsylvania (Pittsburgh) English
 Extinct or near-extinct American English
 Boontling
 Older Southern American English
 Mid-Atlantic or Transatlantic English
 American English-based hybrid languages (creoles or pidgins)
 Afro-Seminole Creole
 Gullah language/Sea Island Creole English, South-East USA related to Bahamian creole
 Hawaiian Pidgin

Canada 
Map of Canadian English.
Canadian English:
 Aboriginal English in Canada
 Bungi of the Canadian Metis people of British descent
 Atlantic Canadian English
 Lunenburg English
 Newfoundland English
 Greater Toronto English
 Ottawa Valley English
 Quebec English
 Standard Canadian English
 Pacific Northwest English

Caribbean, Central, and South America

Caribbean 
 Caribbean English

The Bahamas 
 Bahamian English
 Bahamian Creole

Barbados 
Bajan English

Belize 
 Belizean English

Bermuda 
 Bermudian English

Cayman Islands 
 Cayman Islands English

Falkland Islands 
 Falkland Islands English

Guyana 
 Guyanese English

Honduras 
 Bay Islands English

Jamaica 
 Jamaican English
 Jamaican Patois

Saba
Saban English

Saint Vincent and the Grenadines 
 Vincentian English
 Vincentian Creole
 Iyaric

Trinidad and Tobago 
 Trinidadian English

Asia

Bangladesh 
 Bangladeshi English (Benglish or Banglish)

Brunei 
 Brunei English

Burma 
 Burmese English

Hong Kong 
 Hong Kong English

China 
 Chinese Pidgin English (Extinct)
 Chinglish

India 
Indian English:
 Standard Indian English
Indian English: the "standard" English used by administration and educated people, it derives from the British Indian Empire.
Butler English: (also Bearer English or Kitchen English), once an occupational dialect, now a social dialect.
Hinglish: a growing macaronic hybrid use of English and Indian languages. 
Regional and local Indian English
 East Region: Oriya English, Maithili English, Assamese/Bengali English, North-East Indian English etc.
 West Region: Gujarati English, Maharashtrian English etc.
 North Region: Hindustani English, Delhi/Punjabi English, UP/Bihari English, Rajasthani English etc.
 South Region: Telugu English, Kannada English, Kanglish, Tenglish, Tanglish, Tamil English, Malayali English etc.

Japan 
 English in Japan
 Engrish

Korea 
 Korean English
 Konglish

Malaysia 
 Malaysian English
 Manglish

Middle East 
 Middle Eastern English (or Arablish)

Nepal 
 Nepali English

Pakistan 
 Pakistani English

Philippines 
 Philippine English
 Taglish
 Bislish

Singapore 
 Singapore English
 Singlish

Sri Lanka 
 Sri Lankan English

Africa

Cameroon 
 Cameroonian English

The Gambia 
 Gambian English

Ghana 
 Ghanaian English

Kenya 
 Kenyan English

Liberia 
 Liberian English
 Merico language

Malawi 
 Malawian English

Namibia 
 Namlish

Nigeria 
 Nigerian English

Sierra Leone 
 Sierra Leonean English

South Africa 
 South African English: Black South African English, White South African English, Indian South African English etc.
 Cape Flats English

South Atlantic 
 South Atlantic English spoken on Tristan da Cunha and Saint Helena

Uganda 
 Ugandan English

Zambia 
 Zambian English

Zimbabwe
 Zimbabwean English

Oceania

Australia 
Australian English
 General Australian: Broad Australian, Cultivated Australian, Wog accent etc.
 Australian Aboriginal English
 South Australian English
 Western Australian English
 Torres Strait English

Fiji 
 Fiji English

New Zealand 
New Zealand English: Maori English, Southland accent, Taranaki accent etc.

South Atlantic 
 South Atlantic English

World Global English 
These dialects are used in everyday conversation almost all over the world, and are used as lingua francas and to determine grammar rules and guidelines. 
 Standard English
 Special English 
 International English
 English as a lingua franca
 Simplified Technical English

See also 
 American English regional vocabulary
 North American English regional phonology
 English-based creole languages
 History of the English language
 Old English
 Middle English
 Early Modern English
 Modern English
 Linguistic purism in English
 List of English-based pidgins
 Macaronic language
 Regional accents of English
 Schneider's dynamic model
 Survey of English Dialects
 World Englishes

References

Further reading 
 
 .
 .
 
 
 .
 
 .
 .

External links 

 Sounds Familiar? Listen to examples of regional accents and dialects from across the UK on the British Library's 'Sounds Familiar?' website
 A national map of the regional dialects of American English
 IDEA  – International Dialects of English Archive
 English Dialects – English Dialects around the world
 Dialect poetry from the English regions
 American Languages: Our Nation's Many Voices - An online audio resource presenting interviews with speakers of German-American and American English dialects from across the United States
  electronic World Atlas of Varieties of English (eWAVE)

 
English Dialects
English as a global language